María Paulina Saball Astaburuaga (born 26 October 1952) is a Chilean politician and social worker. She was a minister during the second government of Michelle Bachelet.

Saball studied at the Pontifical Catholic University of Chile, where she was a member of the leftist movement Popular Unitary Action Movement (MAPU).

Saball was an opponent to the Pinochet dictatorship and was linked to human rights defense groups through various entities, such as the Committee of Cooperation for Peace in Chile and the Vicariate of Solidarity. Similarly, once returned the democracy she was part of the National Commission for Truth and Reconciliation (Rettig Report) during the christian-democratic government of Patricio Aylwin.

References

External links
 

1952 births
Living people
Pontifical Catholic University of Chile alumni
21st-century Chilean politicians
Party for Democracy (Chile) politicians
Politicians from Santiago